Polygala calcarea, the chalk milkwort, is a species of flowering plant in the family Polygalaceae, native to western Europe.

Etymology
The specific epithet calcarea means "growing in lime", though this plant will grow in a range of soils.

Cultivation
It prefers sharply drained conditions, and is suitable for cultivation in an alpine garden.

Cultivars
The cultivar 'Lillet' has gained the Royal Horticultural Society's Award of Garden Merit.

References

calcarea
Flora of Europe